Gustavus A. Loomis (September 23, 1789 – March 5, 1872) was a United States Army officer who served during the War of 1812, Seminole Wars, the Mexican–American War and the American Civil War. He was one of the oldest soldiers to serve in the civil war.

Biography
Loomis was born in Thetford, Vermont, and graduated from West Point in 1811.

He entered the army as a second lieutenant of artillery. After garrison duty in the harbor of New York in 1812–13, he was ordered to the Niagara frontier in 1813 for service in the War of 1812. He assisted in the capture of Fort George (May 27, 1813) and was made prisoner at Fort Niagara on December 19, 1813. He was exchanged and transferred to the Artillery Corps on May 12, 1814.

Following the War of 1812, Loomis was promoted to captain in 1819. He was transferred to the infantry in 1821. In 1832, during the Black Hawk War, he was in garrison at Fort Crawford, Wisconsin. During the Second Seminole War; Loomis was promoted to major in the 2nd U.S. Infantry Regiment in 1838. He was promoted to lieutenant colonel on September 22, 1840. He commanded the 6th U.S. Infantry Regiment in Florida (1842–1844) and served as Lieut. Col of the 6th U.S. Infantry in the Mexican War (1846–1848). On March 9, 1851, Loomis was promoted to colonel and was given command of the 5th U.S. Infantry Regiment at Fort Belknap, Texas (1852–1853). During the Third Seminole War, he served as commander of the Department of Florida from 1857–1858.

During the Civil War, he was so successful as a recruiter in Connecticut and Rhode Island that President Lincoln made him Superintendent of General Recruiting for the entire Union army at Fort Columbus, New York. He also served as commandant of the prisoner of war camp at Fort Columbus.

On June 1, 1863, Loomis was retired from active duty as a colonel of infantry, but was immediately recalled to duty. In 1864 he was assigned as a senior court martial officer at Fort Columbus. He remained on active duty after the war to process administrative and court martial proceedings. In 1867 he was still in uniform, managing army supply, personnel, and administrative issues related to his duties as a court martial officer.

On July 17, 1866, President Andrew Johnson nominated Loomis for appointment to the brevet grade of brigadier general in the Regular Army for long and faithful service, to rank from March 13, 1865, and the U.S. Senate confirmed the appointment on July 26, 1866.

Gustavus Loomis died on March 5, 1872, at Stratford Connecticut. He was buried at Grove Street Cemetery, New Haven, Connecticut. Throughout his life in the military he was often known as a Christian officer.

See also

 List of American Civil War brevet generals (Union)

Notes

External links

References
 Eicher, John H., and David J. Eicher, Civil War High Commands. Stanford: Stanford University Press, 2001. .

People of Vermont in the American Civil War
United States Army personnel of the Seminole Wars
Union Army colonels
American people of the Black Hawk War
United States Army personnel of the War of 1812
United States Military Academy alumni
United States Army officers
1789 births
1872 deaths
People from Thetford, Vermont
Burials at Grove Street Cemetery
War of 1812 prisoners of war held by the United Kingdom